River Landscape is a 1642 landscape painting by the Dutch artist Salomon van Ruysdael. It is now in the Musée des Beaux-Arts of Strasbourg, France. Its inventory numbers is 277.

The painting was bought in 1892 by Wilhelm von Bode from the London art dealer Martin Colnaghi and entered the Strasbourg collection the following year. The work is signed and dated, but the date has sometimes been misread as "1622" instead of "1642". Most of the surface of River Landscape is covered by a friendly sky. The landscape below is bustling with life: fishermen, huntsmen, ducks, and drinking cattle. The castle in the background has been identified as Muiden Castle, and the river as the Vecht. Muiden Castle was a center of Dutch cultural life at this time (Muiderkring).

References 

Paintings in the collection of the Musée des Beaux-Arts de Strasbourg
1642 paintings
Paintings by Salomon van Ruysdael
Oil paintings